Luciane Hammes (born ) is a Brazilian group rhythmic  gymnast. She represents her nation at international competitions. She competed at world championships, including at the 2005 World Rhythmic Gymnastics Championships in Baku, Azerbaijan.

References

1988 births
Living people
Brazilian rhythmic gymnasts
Place of birth missing (living people)
South American Games gold medalists for Brazil
South American Games medalists in gymnastics
Competitors at the 2006 South American Games
20th-century Brazilian women
21st-century Brazilian women